The white ribbon eel, Pseudechidna brummeri, is a species of saltwater eels, the only member of the genus Pseudechidna of the Muraenidae (Moray eel) family.  It is found in the Indo-Pacific oceans from the western Indian Ocean to Samoa, and north to the Ryukyu Islands. Its length is 8-30 inches.

References

 

Muraenidae
Fish described in 1858